Rouben Melik (Ռուբեն Մելիք, 14 November 1921 – 21 May 2007) was a French-Armenian poet and a member of the French Resistance. Officer of Ordre des Arts et Lettres (1963).

Rouben Melik studied in Sorbonne with Gaston Bachelard, before his entrance to the literature under the aegis of the Resistance. One year after the publication in 1941 of Variations of triptyches, he joined the French Communist Party where he became a friend of Paul Eluard, alongside the Manouchian group and took part in the liberation of Paris. After the war, he founded "Armenian Youth of France" organization.

Winner of Apollinaire prize in 1948.

References

External links
Biography

1921 births
2007 deaths
French people of Armenian descent
University of Paris alumni
French male poets
20th-century French poets
Officiers of the Ordre des Arts et des Lettres
20th-century French male writers
Prix Guillaume Apollinaire winners